Holiday Rhythm is a 1950 American musical film directed by Jack Scholl and starring Mary Beth Hughes, David Street and Wally Vernon. It is a B movie revue released by the poverty row studio Lippert Pictures.

The film's sets were designed by the art director Frank Paul Sylos.

Plot

Cast
 Mary Beth Hughes as Alice  
 David Street as Larry Carter  
 Wally Vernon as Klaxon  
 Tex Ritter as Tex Ritter 
 Alan Harris as Mr. Superdyne 
 Donald MacBride as Earl E. Byrd  
 Chuy Reyes as Mambo Orchestra Leader  
 Ike Carpenter as Specialty Act  
 Nappy Lamare as Nappy LaMare 
 George Arnold as Specialty Act  
 Sid Melton as Sid Melton  
 The Cass County Boys as Singing Trio  
 Bert Dodson as Bert – Cass County Boys
 Fred S. Martin as Fred – Cass County Boys  
 Jerry Scoggins as Jerry – Cass County Boys  
 Tommy Noonan as Surgeon 
 Bobby Chang as Specialty Act  
 Peter Marshall as Orderly  
 Regina Day as Dancer  
 Glen Turnbull as Irish Dancer  
 Vera Lee as Dancer  
 Tommy Ladd as Dancer

Production
The film was shot in three days at a cost of $45,000.

References

Bibliography
 Fetrow, Alan G. Feature Films, 1950–1959: A United States Filmography. McFarland, 1999.

External links
 
 
 

1950 films
1950 musical films
American musical films
Lippert Pictures films
American black-and-white films
1950s English-language films
1950s American films